The Treaty of Saint Petersburg was signed in Saint Petersburg on April 5, 1812 between Sweden and the Russian Empire. The treaty established an alliance between Russia and Sweden against the French Empire of Napoleon. The alliance was invoked during the War of the Sixth Coalition.

See also 
Napoleonic Wars

References

Further reading 
 Will Durant, Ariel Durant (1975) The Age of Napoleon (Simon and Schuster) 
 Ulf Sundberg (1997) Svenska freder och stillestånd 1249-1814 (Hjalmarson & Högberg) 

19th century in the Russian Empire
1812 treaties
1812 in the Russian Empire
1812 in Sweden
Saint Petersburg (1812)
Saint Petersburg (1812)
Saint Petersburg (1812)
Russia–Sweden treaties